Miloslav Mečíř was the defending champion, but lost in the third round to Thomas Muster.

Andre Agassi won the title by defeating Andrés Gómez 6–4, 6–2 in the final.

Seeds
All seeds received a bye to the second round.

Draw

Finals

Top half

Section 1

Section 2

Bottom half

Section 3

Section 4

References

External links
 Official results archive (ATP)
 Official results archive (ITF)

Stuttgart Singles
Singles 1988